Lovin' Things is the fourth album by American rock group The Grass Roots. The album was originally released by Dunhill Records in 1969. The album charted at #73. It contained only two songs composed by the group. The album was intended to take the group into a soulful direction that was being rewarded by charting singles. The A and B side singles released were "Lovin' Things", "The River Is Wide", "(You Gotta) Live for Love" and "Fly Me to Havana". At the end of this run, "I'd Wait a Million Years" was released as an A side and became the group's next charting single, appearing on their next album, Leaving It All Behind.

Songs
The songs featured unique horn punctuated touches by arranger Jimmie Haskell. The songs were written by outside composers, with the exception of two from the group songwriting team of Entner and Grill. This was a notable decrease in compositions by group members compared to their previous two studio albums, Let's Live for Today and Feelings, which contained four and seven group member penned tracks, respectively. Dunhill Records executives decided that since "Midnight Confessions" previously performed so well in the charts, they would take the group output in the same direction with the strong use of horns and wind instruments. A new soulful direction first surfaced on this album and continued on their next album, titled Leaving It All Behind. The group continued to move forward with multiple hit records until 1973. This is the last album with guitarist Creed Bratton, who left the group in early 1969. It is also the last album by the group to feature songs written by P.F. Sloan.

Artwork, packaging
The original release of Lovin' Things is on Dunhill ABC as mono or stereo. The front cover designed by Philip Schwartz.

Singles

Track listing
All songs produced by Steve Barri.

Personnel
The Grass Roots
Rob Grill – vocals, bass
Warren Entner – guitar, organ, vocals
Creed Bratton – guitar, vocals
Rick Coonce (Mr. Rhythm) – drums, percussion
Other personnel
Steve Barri – producer
Phil Kaye – engineer, thunder
Jimmie Haskell – arrangements
Session musicians: Hal Blaine, Joe Osborn, Larry Knechtel, Ben Benay, Mike Deasy

References 

1969 albums
The Grass Roots albums
Albums arranged by Jimmie Haskell
Albums produced by Steve Barri
Dunhill Records albums